The Kayan are a sub-group of Red Karen (Karenni people), Tibeto-Burman ethnic minority of Myanmar (Burma). The Kayan consists of the following groups: Kayan Lahwi (also called Padaung), Kayan Ka Khaung (Gekho), Kayan Lahta, Kayan Ka Ngan. Kayan Gebar, Kayan Kakhi and, sometimes, Bwe people (Kayaw). They are distinct from, and not to be confused with, the Kayan people of Borneo.

Padaung (Yan Pa Doung) is a Shan term for the Kayan Lahwi (the group in which women wear the brass neck rings). The Kayan residents in Mae Hong Son Province in Northern Thailand refer to themselves as Kayan and object to being called Padaung. In The Hardy Padaungs (1967) Khin Maung Nyunt, one of the first authors to use the term "Kayan", says that the Padaung prefer to be called Kayan.
On the other hand, Pascal Khoo Thwe calls his people Padaung in his 2002 memoir, From the Land of Green Ghosts: A Burmese Odyssey.

In the late 1980s and early 1990s due to conflict with the military regime in Myanmar, many Kayan tribes fled to the  Thai border area. Among the refugee camps set up there was a Long Neck section, which became a tourist site, self-sufficient on tourist revenue and not needing financial assistance.

According to U Aung Roe (1999:21ss) Kayan number about 90,000 in Shan State (around the Pekhon Township area) about 20,000 around Thandaung kayin state, and 70,000 in Kayah State (around Demawso and Loikaw). A 2004 estimate puts the population at approximately 180,000.  About 600 Kayan reside in the three villages open to tourists in Mae Hong Sorn, or in the Ban Mai Nai Soy refugee camp.

Geography

Present settlement of the Kayans 

According to Kayan tradition the Kayan settled in the Demawso area of Karenni State (Kayah State) in 739 AD. Today, they reside in Karenni (Kayah) State around Demawso and Loikow, in the southern region of Shan State and in Mandalay’s Pyinmana and Karen’s Than Daung township.

There are three Kayan villages in Mae Hong Son province in Thailand. The largest is Huay Pu Keng, on the Pai river, close to the Thai Myanmar border. Huai Seau Tao is a commercial village opened in 1995. Many of the residents of Ban Nai Soi Kayan Longneck village moved into the Karenni refugee camp in September 2008, but 20 families and 104 residents remain there, according to the sign at the entrance as of February 2001.

Culture

Brass coils 

Women of the Kayan tribes identify themselves by their forms of dress. Women of the Kayan Lahwi tribe are well known for wearing neck rings, brass coils that are placed around the neck, appearing to lengthen it. 

Girls first start to wear rings when they are around 5 years old.
Over the years, the coil is replaced by a longer one and more turns are added. The weight of the brass pushes the collar bone down and compresses the rib cage. The neck itself is not lengthened; the appearance of a stretched neck is created by the deformation of the clavicle.
Many ideas regarding why the coils are worn have been suggested. Anthropologists have hypothesized that the rings protected women from becoming slaves, making them less attractive to other tribes. It has also been theorised that the coils originate from the desire to look more attractive by exaggerating sexual dimorphism, as women have more slender necks than men. It has also been suggested that the coils give the women resemblance to a dragon, an important figure in Kayan folklore. The coils might be meant to protect from tiger bites, perhaps literally, but probably symbolically.

Kayan women, when asked, acknowledge these ideas, and often say that their purpose for wearing the rings is cultural identity (one associated with beauty).

The coil, once on, is seldom removed, as the coiling and uncoiling is a lengthy procedure. It is usually only removed to be replaced by a new or longer coil. The muscles covered by the coil become weakened. Many women have removed the rings for medical examinations. Most women prefer to wear the rings once their clavicle has been lowered, as the area of the neck and collarbone often becomes bruised and discolored. Additionally, the collar feels like an integral part of the body after ten or more years of continuous wear.

In 2006, some of the younger women in Mae Hong Son started to remove their rings, either to give them the opportunity to continue their education or in protest against the exploitation of their culture and the restrictions that came with it. In late 2008, most of the young women who entered the refugee camp removed their rings. One woman who had worn the rings for over 40 years removed them. After removing the rings, women report discomfort that fades after about three days. The discoloration is more persistent.

The government of Myanmar began discouraging neck rings as it struggled to appear more modern to the developed world. Consequently, many women in Myanmar began breaking the tradition, though a few older women and some of the younger girls in remote villages continued to wear rings. In Thailand, the practice has gained popularity in recent years, because it draws tourists who bring revenue to the tribe and to the local businessmen who run the villages and collect an entry fee of 500 to 600 baht per person. The Karenni National People's Liberation Front (KNPLF), an armed cease-fire group, have made attempts to invite the Kayan to return to Kayah State to set up their own tourist villages.

In January 2008, the UNHCR expressed reservations about tourists visiting the Kayan villages in Northern Thailand due to the provincial government’s refusal to allow registered Kayan refugees to take up offers of resettlement in developed countries. It is believed this policy was linked to their economic importance to the area. This policy was relaxed in late 2008 and a small group of Kayan have left for New Zealand in August 2008. 
Others entered the main Karenni refugee camp (which is not open to tourists) in September 2008 and they are now eligible for resettlement.

Courtship & marriage rituals 
In the past, the choice of marriage partners was usually the responsibility of the parents; today, young people often select their own partner. The rule of marriage is only those genetically related are allowed to marry. It is preferable for first cousins to get married. However, marriage between different generations is taboo. Marriages with in-laws or conflicting clans who have sworn not to marry for several generations is forbidden. It is believed that if these rules are violated, misfortune falls upon all their relatives.

When a young man has decided upon a girl, his parents will approach her parents with a gift.  If the girl accepts then the couple are now engaged. The young man’s family have to provide a dowry to seal the contract. Usually the daughter-in-law will move in with her husband upon marriage and in that case, the price is higher than if the man moves in with his wife. The contract ceremony may be ended by the families eating chicken provided by the groom’s family together. In this way, the couple will love each other forever. The bride price consists of several parts:

 the initial lascion or pledge;
 the tacu or the purchase proper, in money, buffalos etc. which belongs to the father of the girl to pay him for his guardianship;
 the talio which is divided up among the closest relatives, and consists for the most part of utensils, mats, household goods etc.
 the maithu or “milk compensation”, which belongs to the mother of the bride to compensate her for the milk given when the girl was a baby, and usually consists of a silver coin or even a little buffalo, which the mother keeps for her funeral;
 the tiki or little gift of money given to the bride before they are united.
 rice, pork, Thi (rice wine) and other food items or betel nuts for the wedding feast

Traditional religion 

The Kayans' traditional religion is called Kan Khwan, and has been practiced since the people migrated from Mongolia during the Bronze Age.  It includes the belief that the Kayan people are the result of a union between a female dragon and a male human/angel hybrid.
 
The major religious festival is the three-day Kay Htein Bo festival, which commemorates the belief that the creator god gave form to the world by planting a small post in the ground. During this festival, held in late March or early April, a Kay Htoe Boe pole is erected and participants dance around the pole. This festival is held to venerate the eternal god and creator messengers, to give thanks for blessings during the year, to appeal for forgiveness, and pray for rain. It is also an opportunity for Kayan from different villages to come together to maintain the solidarity of the tribe.

The Kayan have a strong belief in augury and nothing is done without reference to some form of divination, including breaking thatch grass, but most importantly consulting the chicken bones.

In present times, the annual Kay Htein Bo festival is always accompanied by a reading of the chicken bones to predict the year ahead.  Fowl bone prognostication can be witnessed in the Kayan villages in Thailand's Mae Hong Son province during the annual festival, and during "cleansing ceremonies" that a family holds when it has encountered ill fortune. They also use dreams to make predictions.

Current religious practices 
Although many of the Kayan still participate in these traditional festivals, in the 19th century Italian missionaries worked amongst them for many years and today the majority of Kayan and Kayaw people are Roman Catholics. Statistics published in 2005 list 306 Kayan villages, out of which 209 are Roman Catholic, 19 Kan Khwan, 32 Baptist, and 44 Buddhist, of which 2 belong to the Byamaso civil society organization.

See also 
 Ndebele people of South Africa - An African tribe with a similar practice.
 The Kayan of Borneo share the name but are not related and do not have the same customs.
 Pole worship

References 
{{reflist|2}

External links 

 Padaung, a subgroup of Karen, The Peoples of the World Foundation
 Huay Pu Keng: Long Neck Village Website about this Kayan village in Thailand contains information on Kayan history, religion, and culture
 Karenni Homeland Current news from Karenni State
 Burmese women in Thai "human zoo" BBC News article
 Flicker Group: Long-Necked Karén
  Hostage to Tourism Article by Edith T. Mirante. Need to create account to view article.
 French Language page with introduction, notes and bibliography of Kayah, Kayan, Karenni et Yang Daeng by Jean-Marc Rastorfer

Ethnic groups in Myanmar
Karen people
Ethnic groups in Vietnam
Ethnic groups in Minnesota